General Larson may refer to:

August Larson (1904–1981), U.S. Marine Corps major general
Doyle E. Larson (1930–2007), U.S. Air Force major general
Duane S. Larson (1916–2005), North Dakota Air National Guard brigadier general
Jess Larson (1904–1987), U.S. Air Force Reserve major general
John David Larson (fl. 1960s–1990s), U.S. National Guard brigadier general
Westside T. Larson (1892–1977), U.S. Air Force major general

See also
General Larsen (disambiguation)